Byeong-heon, also spelled Byung-hun, or Pyong-hon, is a Korean masculine given name. Its meaning depends on the hanja used to write each syllable of the name. There are 17 hanja with the reading "byung" and seven hanja with the reading "hun" on the South Korean government's official list of hanja which may be used in given names.

People with this name include:
Yu Byeong-heon (born 1964), South Korean cyclist
Lee Byung-hun (born 1970), South Korean actor
Lee Byeong-heon (filmmaker) (born 1980), South Korean filmmaker
Min Byung-hun (born 1987), South Korean baseball right fielder
Lee Byung-heon (biochemist), South Korean biochemist

See also
List of Korean given names

References

Korean masculine given names